Larios is a surname with origins in Spain. Notable people with the surname include:

Angélica Larios (born 1981), Mexican sabre fencer
Bobby Larios (born 1970), Mexican actor
Carlos de Larios, American sound engineer
César Larios (born 1988), Salvadoran footballer
Chris Larios of Channel Awesome, an American online media production company based in Lombard, Illinois
Dora De Larios (born 1933), American ceramist and sculptor working in Los Angeles
Emma Larios Gaxiola (born 1954), Mexican politician affiliated with the PAN, Senator of the LXI Legislature of the Mexican Congress
Francisco García Larios, the Governor of Texas between 1744 and 1748
Graciela Larios Rivas (born 1950), Mexican politician affiliated with the Institutional Revolutionary Party
Héctor Larios Córdova (born 1954), Mexican politician affiliated with the PAN, Senator of the LXII Legislature of the Mexican Congress
Jean-François Larios (born 1956), retired football midfielder from France
José María Larios (died 1829), Mexican insurgent who served as a captain under José María Morelos y Pavón
Lilia Fernandez Larios (1926–2011), Mexican television and film actress, active during the Golden Age of Mexican cinema
Óscar Larios (born 1976), professional boxer from Mexico and former WBC Super Bantamweight and Featherweight champion
Pablo Larios (born 1960), football goalkeeper from Mexico

See also
Estádio de Los Larios, football stadium located in Xerém, a district of Duque de Caxias, Rio de Janeiro, Brazil
Manny Pacquiao vs. Óscar Larios, a professional boxing super featherweight fight held in 2006 in the Philippines
Arios (disambiguation)
Lari (disambiguation)